The 1938 Ipswich by-election was held when the incumbent Conservative MP, Sir John Ganzoni, was elevated to the peerage.

1938 elections in the United Kingdom
1938 in England
Ipswich
1938